George Malcolm Brown, OC (July 16, 1916 – May 19, 1977) was a Canadian physician.

He was born in Campbellford, Ontario, and was educated at Queen's University and Oxford University. Brown served in the Royal Canadian Army Medical Corps in Europe. He was a professor of medicine at Queen's from 1951 to 1965. He served as president of the Ontario College of Physicians and Surgeons from 1956 to 1958 and of the Royal College of Physicians and Surgeons of Canada from 1962 to 1964. He was a committee member of the Medical Research Council of Canada from 1953 to 1965 and served as its first full-time president from 1965 to 1977.

He was named to the Canadian Medical Hall of Fame in 2000. The G. Malcolm Brown Memorial Fund was established in his memory to promote health science research in Canada.

References 

1916 births
1977 deaths
Canadian military doctors
Physicians from Ontario
Queen's University at Kingston alumni
Alumni of the University of Oxford
20th-century Canadian physicians
Canadian expatriates in the United Kingdom
Officers of the Order of Canada